Waldron Mercy Academy is a private K-8 Catholic elementary school sponsored by the Sisters of Mercy and located in the Archdiocese of Philadelphia in Merion Station, Pennsylvania. The school is accredited by the Middle States Association of Colleges and Schools and has twice won National Blue Ribbon School recognition (in 2001 and 2009) from the United States Department of Education.

History
Catherine McAuley, the Irish foundress of the Sisters of Mercy, and the women who joined her were the driving forces behind establishing learning institutions in the United States.

In 1861, Sister Mary Patricia Waldron, who was 26 at the time, and ten Sisters of Mercy landed in Philadelphia in order to serve the uneducated, poor, and the ailing in the city. Because many of the Sisters became ill themselves while aiding the sick in the city, Waldron bought an eight-acre retreat in Merion for their recovery. In 1885, the adjoining Morgan Estate was purchased. The 13-room stone house became St. Anne Convent, and the farmhouse held the Village School for the local farm children.

The Sisters of Mercy began Mater Misericordiae, an academy for young ladies and boys under 12 years of age, in 1885. In 1923, the male boarding students moved to a new school on the property—Waldron Academy for Boys.

By 1946 the boarders had gone, and Waldron Academy was an all-boys school which was still taught by the Sisters of Mercy. Lay faculty and staff joined the ranks in the 1950s, and soon after Waldron had a preschool, as well as a co-educational Montessori program.

In September 1987 Waldron Academy for Boys and Merion Mercy Academy for Girls (lower school) merged and reopened as Waldron Mercy Academy, a Catholic co-educational school from pre-kindergarten to grade eight. Waldron Mercy Child Care, a year-round program for children ages three months to four years, was added to the school 15 years later.

The third floor attic, which used to keep the boarders' trunks, is now the  Albert T. Perry Memorial Library, which has an art studio and a computer lab. The basement's "little gym" is now the Music Suite, and WMA's science lab prepares students for high school science classes.

Margie Winters controversy

In 2015, the Academy came under public scrutiny for firing of a teacher who is in a same-sex marriage because the school board of directors and the Sisters of Mercy decided that its Catholic identity would be in jeopardy.

Margie Winters, the school's director of religious education, was dismissed from the Academy after a parent reported her directly to the Archdiocese of Philadelphia for marrying her female partner in a civil marriage ceremony in 2007. Winters had informed school administrators when she was hired, and was told to not discuss the matter in school, which she says she abided by. A parent subsequently reported the fact that she had married directly to the Archdiocese of Philadelphia. In response, the principal asked her to resign. Winters declined to do so, and the school decided not to renew her contract. Many teachers and parents in the school community disagreed with the decision and voiced their support for the teacher, with several expressing anger and concern. Principal Nell Stetser said that "many of us accept life choices that contradict current Church teachings, but to continue as a Catholic school, Waldron Mercy must comply with those teachings." But she called urgently for "an open and honest discussion about this and other divisive issues at the intersection of our society and our Church." The Huffington Post said that the Archbishop of Philadelphia Charles Chaput had ignored such a call. Instead, Chaput had praised the "character and common sense [of school administrators] at a moment when both seem to be uncommon."

In September 2015 Winters was invited to a reception held at the White House with President Barack Obama to welcome Pope Francis on his visit to the U.S.

Awards
In 2016, a team of three boys in fourth grade won the Toshiba ExploraVision competition's region 2 competition besting hundreds of teams and schools along the east coast. In 2015, a team of three third grade girls won the national competition besting all teams in the K-3 grade level. Waldron has participated in the Toshiba ExploraVision competition for 12 years, winning multiple honors including national, regional, and honorable mentions for the last four years.

In 2001 and 2009, Waldron Mercy Academy was named a Blue Ribbon School by the U.S. Department of Education. This is the highest honor bestowed on a US school.

Notable alumni
Philip Aloysius Hart, U.S. Senator from Michigan (D) from 1959 until 1976.
 Bill Kuharich, former vice president of player personnel, Kansas City Chiefs.
M. Night Shyamalan, director, The Sixth Sense.
 Brian Tierney, former CEO and publisher, The Philadelphia Inquirer.

References

External links

Catholic elementary schools in Philadelphia
Schools in Montgomery County, Pennsylvania
Lower Merion Township, Pennsylvania
Educational institutions established in 1885
Sisters of Mercy schools
1885 establishments in Pennsylvania